is the abbreviation of the , and was a military rank used in the Soviet Union. Between 1918 and 1935, it was a rank in the Red Army, roughly equivalent to Flotilla commander in the Red Fleet. In 1935, the rank was split in two, before being abolished and replaced by Army general in 1940.

Split
In 1935, new ranks were introduced, splitting the  rank into two ranks.

See also
 Ranks and insignia of the Red Army and Navy 1918–1935
 Ranks and insignia of the Red Army and Navy 1935–1940

References

Military ranks of the Soviet Union